The flag of Great Britain, commonly known as King's Colours, the first Union Flag, the Union Jack, or the British flag, was used at sea from 1606 and more generally from 1707 to 1801. It was the first flag of Great Britain. It is the precursor to the Union Jack of 1801.

The design was ordered by King James VI and I to be used on ships on the high seas, and it subsequently came into use as a national flag following the Treaty of Union and Acts of Union 1707, gaining the status of "the Ensign armorial of Great Britain", the newly created state. It was later adopted by land forces, although the blue of the field used on land-based versions more closely resembled that of the blue of the flag of Scotland.

The flag consists of the red cross of Saint George, patron saint of England, superimposed on the Saltire of Saint Andrew, patron saint of Scotland. Its correct proportions are 3:5. The blue field on the flag was sky blue at first, but over time, the blue began to darken.

The flag's official use came to an end in 1801 with the creation of the United Kingdom of Great Britain and Ireland. At that time Saint Patrick's Flag was added to the flag of Great Britain to create the present-day Union Flag.

Creation
By James I of England, King of Scots, Orders in Council, 1606:

James had the habit of referring to a "Kingdom of Great Britain", considering that it had been created by the Union of the Crowns. However, despite the personal union which he represented, in practice England and Scotland continued as separate kingdoms, each with its own parliament and laws, for another century. The Kingdom of Great Britain finally came into being in 1707. The flag of the new Kingdom was formally chosen on 17 April 1707, two weeks before the Acts of Union of 1707 were to take effect. Henry St George, Garter Principal King of Arms, had presented several possible designs to Queen Anne and the Privy Council.

Scottish variant 
The principal alternative for consideration was a version of the flag with the saltire of Saint Andrew lying on top of that of Saint George, called the "Scots union flag as said to be used by the Scots", but this was rejected.

Proposed versions
In the wake of the union between England and Scotland, several designs for a new flag were drawn up, juxtaposing the Saint George's Cross and the St Andrew's Saltire:

However, none were acceptable to James.

After 1801
With the 1801 change to the British flag, British ensigns and other official designs incorporating it nearly all changed as well, either immediately or when pre-existing stocks were used up. An exception is the Commissioners' flag of the Northern Lighthouse Board, whose old stock lasted so long that its anachronistic design became fixed by tradition. The old flag has been included in some later designs to mark a pre-1801 British connection, as with the coat of arms of the Colony of Sierra Leone adopted in 1914 or the flag of Baton Rouge, Louisiana adopted in 1995. The Flag of Somerset County, Maryland, briefly used from 1694, was revived after being rediscovered in 1958. The flag of Taunton, Massachusetts officially adopted a reconstruction of an American Revolutionary banner at the bicentennial of its 1774 introduction; similarly, Westmoreland County, Pennsylvania in 1973 adopted the 1775 flag of John Proctor's Independent Battalion of Westmoreland County Provincials.

See also
 List of English flags
 List of Scottish flags
 Protectorate Jack
 Union Flag
 List of flags of the United Kingdom

References

 National symbols of Great Britain
 Unionism in the United Kingdom
1707 establishments in Great Britain
1606 establishments in England
1800 disestablishments in Great Britain
1606 establishments in Scotland